"Wasted" is a song written by Marv Green, Troy Verges and Hillary Lindsey, and recorded by American country music artist Carrie Underwood.  It was released in February 2007 as the sixth and final single from her multi-platinum debut album, Some Hearts. It began receiving country radio airplay as an album track, causing it to place on the US Country chart weeks before its official release as a single.

Content
The song is a mid-tempo that deals with themes of addiction, including alcoholism. The song has two characters who each have to stop the addiction from taking over their lives.  One of them gets out of addiction to a relationship, and the other gets out of addiction to alcohol.

Music video
In January 2007, Underwood filmed the video for the song in Tampa, Florida. This was her fourth music video, and it was released during the beginning of February. The music video premiered on CMT Loaded.com.

For Underwood's fourth music video from Some Hearts, she appears in different, simple scenes, such as a house. An actor is also featured in the video, who fits the character dealing with the theme of the song. The music video is in complete black & white format, and it was released in early February, sooner than expected, thanks to the song's radio success. A shortened version of the song is used in the video, cutting out nearly a full minute of the song.

Chart performance
The sixth single from her debut album, "Wasted" become Carrie's fourth consecutive number one country single and fifth overall number one single. It spent three weeks at number one on the country charts. It debuted at number 57 on the country charts before its official release. The song also received a significant amount of digital downloads on the iTunes music store after her performance of the song on American Idol.  The song sold 705,000 as of October 2011. On August 10, 2015 "Wasted" was officially certified Platinum.

Year-end charts

Live performances
Underwood performed the song on American Idol on March 8, 2007, after they paid her a tribute for her achievements since winning Idol in May 2005. She also performed the song live during the 2007 Academy of Country Music Awards on May 15.

Underwood has performed it on all of her concert tours.

Awards

2007 ASCAP Country Music Awards

|-
| align="center"|2007 ||align="center"| "Wasted" ||align="center"| Most Performed Song of the Year ||

References

2000s ballads
2005 songs
Carrie Underwood songs
2007 singles
Pop ballads
Country ballads
Songs about alcohol
Songs written by Hillary Lindsey
Music videos directed by Roman White
Songs written by Troy Verges
Arista Nashville singles
Song recordings produced by Mark Bright (record producer)
Songs written by Marv Green